Olive Blanche Davies MSc (27 October 1884 – 1976/7)  was an Australian botanist and botanical artist, noted for being co-author with Alfred Ewart of their 1917 book The Flora of the Northern Territory, and for producing many of the illustrations.

Olive was born Toorak, Victoria, the youngest of six children of Elizabeth Locke Mercer (*c1850) from Kirkcudbright and Sir Matthew Henry Davies (1850-1912)  of Geelong.

She was a government research scholar studying biology at Melbourne University, and wrote a paper in 1911 on Petterd's semi-slug Cystopelta petterdi, and another in 1914 on Caryodes dufresnii, a large land mollusk native to Tasmania.

On 22 December 1915 at 'Cluden', in Brighton, Australia, Olive Blanche Davies married Arthur Lyle Rossiter, a lieutenant in the Australian Expeditionary Force, and elder son of Edward Lyle Rossiter of Elsternwick. Arthur had been born in 1888 in Ballarat By the end of World War I he had risen to the rank of captain, and after the war he gave a lecture on gas warfare at Melbourne University, from which he had graduated an MSc. in 1911 and had been a demonstrator in physics from 1913. He had served as a gas officer in the 4th Australian Division in France. In 1924 he was appointed on a temporary basis as senior master at Melbourne High School. She died in Adelaide.

References 

1884 births
1976 deaths
Australian women artists
People from Toorak, Victoria
Artists from Melbourne
University of Melbourne alumni
Australian botanists
20th-century Australian artists
Australian people of English descent
Australian people of Welsh descent
Australian people of Scottish descent
Scientists from Melbourne